Avajiq-e Shomali Rural District is in Dashtaki District of Chaldoran County, West Azerbaijan province, Iran. At the National Census of 2006, its population was 2,877 in 625 households. There were 3,699 inhabitants in 1,041 households at the following census of 2011. At the most recent census of 2016, the population of the rural district was 2,975 in 847 households. The largest of its 32 villages was Arab Dizaji, with 629 people. Nine of these villages are populated by Kurds while eight of them are populated by Azeris.

References 

Chaldoran County

Rural Districts of West Azerbaijan Province

Populated places in West Azerbaijan Province

Populated places in Chaldoran County